Bradycinetulus is a genus of earth-boring scarab beetles in the family Bolboceratidae. There are at least three described species in Bradycinetulus.

Species
These three species belong to the genus Bradycinetulus:
 Bradycinetulus ferrugineus (Palisot de Beauvois, 1809)
 Bradycinetulus fossatus (Haldeman, 1853)
 Bradycinetulus rex Cartwright, 1953

References

Further reading

 
 

Bolboceratidae
Articles created by Qbugbot